Serges Déblé (born 1 October 1989) is an Ivorian professional footballer who plays as a winger for Tobol in the Kazakhstan Premier League.

Club career
Born in Anyama, Ivory Coast, Déblé started his career with ASEC Mimosas.

In 2008, he was signed by Charlton Athletic but was loaned out to Angers SCO on 14 July 2008 due to work permit reasons. He then signed on loan for FC Nantes in 2010.

In January 2012, Déblé signed a short contract in Russia with FC Khimki. In May 2012, he joined with Russian first division club FC SKA-Energiya Khabarovsk on loan.

Deblé was released by Viborg FF at the end of the 2016–17 season. He made a free transfer to China League One side Meizhou Hakka on 21 June 2017.

On 15 January 2019, Déblé joined Hong Kong Premier League club R&F. On 14 October 2020, Déblé left the club after his club's withdrawal from the HKPL in the new season. On 13 February 2021, Déblé returned to Danish club Viborg FF. He left the club again at the end of the season.

On 2 July 2021, Déblé returned to the Armenian Premier League, signing for Ararat Yerevan. On 14 January 2022, Déblé left Ararat Yerevan by mutual consent. On 27 January 2022, Déblé signed for fellow Armenian Premier League club FC Pyunik.

On 28 June 2022, Déblé signed for FC Tobol on a one-year contract.

International career
Deblé played with the Ivory Coast U20 at 2009 African Youth Championship in Rwanda.

Honours
Pyunik
 Armenian Premier League: 2021–22

Individual
 Armenian Premier League top scorer: 2021–22 (22 goals)

References

External links
 
 

1989 births
Living people
Ivorian footballers
Ivorian expatriate footballers
Ivory Coast under-20 international footballers
Footballers from Abidjan
Association football midfielders
ASEC Mimosas players
Angers SCO players
Charlton Athletic F.C. players
FC Khimki players
FC SKA-Khabarovsk players
FC Shirak players
Meizhou Hakka F.C. players
R&F (Hong Kong) players
Viborg FF players
2011 CAF U-23 Championship players
Hong Kong Premier League players
China League One players
Danish Superliga players
Danish 1st Division players
Armenian Premier League players
Ligue 2 players
Russian First League players
Expatriate footballers in France
Expatriate footballers in Russia
Expatriate footballers in Armenia
Expatriate footballers in England
Expatriate men's footballers in Denmark
Expatriate footballers in China
Expatriate footballers in Hong Kong
Ivorian expatriate sportspeople in France
Ivorian expatriate sportspeople in Russia
Ivorian expatriate sportspeople in Armenia
Ivorian expatriate sportspeople in England
Ivorian expatriate sportspeople in Denmark
Ivorian expatriate sportspeople in China